Elmer S. Best Memorial Award is an annual award named in memory of the founder of the Pierre Fauchard Academy. It was established by the Board of Trustees in 1962. Recipients of the award must be members of the dental profession and from outside the United States.

 1963 – N. N. Bery (India)
 1964 – Jens Waerhaug (Norway)
 1965 – C. H. M. Williams (Canada)
 1966 – Mario M. Chaves (Brazil)
 1967 – Martin Rushton (England)
 1968 – Ewald Harndt (Germany)
 1969 – Charles F. L. Nord (Netherlands)
 1970 – Donald W. Gullet (Canada)
 1971 – Louis J. Baume (Switzerland)
 1972 – Jens J. Pindborg (Denmark)
 1973 – Cyril Devere-Green (England)
 1974 – Federico Singer (Italy)
 1975 – Hans Friehofer (Switzerland)
 1976 – Jacques Foure (France)
 1977 – Gerald Leatherman (England)
 1978 – Rolf Braun (Germany)
 1979 – Seiji Kawabe (Japan)
 1980 – William G. McIntoch (Canada)
 1981 – Edward O'Brien-Moraz (Ireland)
 1982 – Roberto M. Ruff (Mexico)
 1983 – Yojiro Kawamura (Japan)
 1984 – Fernando J. Brenes-Espinach (Costa Rica)
 1985 – A. Gordon Rowell (Australia)
 1986 – Pierre Marois (France)
 1987 – Ronald E. Jordan (Canada)
 1988 – Robert Harris (Australia)
 1989 – Ruperto Gonzalez-Giralda (Spain)
 1990 – Primo S. Gonzales (Philippines)
 1991 – Hamish Thomson (England)
 1992 – Horst-Wolfgang Haase (Germany)
 1993 – Professor Per-Inguar Brabemark (Sweden)
 1994 – Alfredo Berguido Garrido (Panama) and 1994 – Nicholas A. Mancini (Canada)
 1995 – Clive B. Ross (New Zealand)
 1996 – John W. McLean O.B.E. (United Kingdom)
 1997 – Chang-Duk Kee (Korea)
 1998 – Robert Weill (France)
 1999 – Francisco Raul Miranda (Mexico)
 2000 – Jacques Monet (France)
 2001 – Michael Cripton (Canada)
 2002 – Rufino Achacoso (Philippines)
 2003 – Gunnar Carlson (Sweden)
 2004 – Zhen-KANG Zhang (China)
 2005 – George Zarb (Canada)
 2006 – Pierre Machtou (France)
 2007 – Patrick Henry (Australia
 2008 – Carlo P. Marinello (Switzerland
 2009 – Zbigniew Jańczuk (Poland)
 2010 – José Carlos Elgoyhen (Argentina)
 2011 – José Font-Buxó (Spain)

External links 
 Elmer S. Best Memorial Award, Pierre Fouchard Academy.

Awards established in 1962